Māris Poikāns (born 11 December 1962, Vidriži) is a Latvian bobsledder who competed from the mid-1980s to the early 1990s for Soviet Union. He won the combined men's Bobsleigh World Cup championship in 1989–90. He also won a bronze medal alongside brakeman Andrei Gorochov in the two-man race at the European Championship in 1990.

Competing in two Winter Olympics, Poikans earned his best finish of fifth in the four-man event at Calgary in 1988.

References
1984 bobsleigh four-man results
1988 bobsleigh four-man results
List of combined men's bobsleigh World Cup champions: 1985–2007
List of four-man bobsleigh World Cup champions since 1985
List of two-man bobsleigh World Cup champions since 1985

1962 births
Living people
Latvian male bobsledders
Soviet male bobsledders
Bobsledders at the 1984 Winter Olympics
Bobsledders at the 1988 Winter Olympics
Olympic bobsledders of the Soviet Union
People from Limbaži Municipality